Peter Louis Walters (born 8 June 1952) is an English former footballer who played as a goalkeeper in the Football League for Hull City and Darlington, in the Southern League for Corby Town and Bedford Town, for whom he made 83 appearances in all competitions, and in the Alliance Premier League for Kettering Town and Scarborough. He began his career as a youngster with Middlesbrough.

References

1952 births
Living people
People from Whickham
Footballers from Tyne and Wear
English footballers
Association football goalkeepers
Middlesbrough F.C. players
Hull City A.F.C. players
Darlington F.C. players
Corby Town F.C. players
Bedford Town F.C. players
Kettering Town F.C. players
Scarborough F.C. players
English Football League players
Southern Football League players
National League (English football) players